Octavio Mauricio Zapata Possu (born 14 November 1989) is a Colombian footballer who plays as a defender for Aragua F.C. in the Venezuelan Primera División.

References

Monagas S.C. players
Asociación Civil Deportivo Lara players
Deportivo Anzoátegui players
Aragua FC players
Venezuelan Primera División players
Colombian footballers
Association football defenders
Footballers from Bogotá
1989 births
Living people
Academia Puerto Cabello players